Chopra Kamala Paul Smriti Mahavidyalaya, established in 2013,  is the undergraduate degree college in Chopra,  Uttar Dinajpur district. It offers undergraduate courses in arts. The campus is in the Uttar Dinajpur district. It is affiliated to  University of North Bengal.

Departments

Arts

Bengali 
English
History
Political Science
Urdu
Philosophy
Education

See also

References

External links
http://www.chopracollege.com/index.php
University of North Bengal
University Grants Commission
National Assessment and Accreditation Council

Colleges affiliated to University of North Bengal
Educational institutions established in 2013
Universities and colleges in Uttar Dinajpur district
2013 establishments in West Bengal